
This is a list of political parties oriented around feminism and women's issues.

Political parties whose main ideology is feminism

Argentina
National Feminist Party (historical)
Female Peronist Party (historical)

Armenia
Shamiram Women's Movement

Australia
Women for Canberra Movement
Australian Women's Party (1943)
Australian Women's Party (1977)
Australian Women's Party (1995)
What Women Want
The Women's Party registered 2019. https://thewomensparty.org.au

Austria
Austrian Women's Party (historical)

Belarus
Belarusian Women's Party "Nadzieja"

Belgium
General Party of Women (historical)
United Feminist Party

Brazil
Mostra Feminista de Arte e Resistência

Bulgaria
Democratic Women's Union

Cambodia
Cambodian Women's Party

Canada
Feminist Party of Canada

Chile
Chilean Women's Party
Women's Progressive Party

Costa Rica
New Feminist League Party

Cuba
National Feminist Party (historical)

Czech Republic
Public for Family—Women's Party (Czechoslovakia)

Denmark
Women's Party (Greenland)

Egypt
National Feminist Party
Daughter of the Nile Union

Finland
Women's Party
Feminist Party (Finland)

France
United Feminist Party

Georgia
Women's Party of Georgia

Germany
Women's Party (West Germany)
Feminist Party of Germany

Hong Kong
Women Political Participation Network

Hungary
Christian Women's Party (historical)
Hungarian Women's Party
Hungarian Feminist Party

Iceland
Women's List

India
Womanist Party of India
United Women Front
All India Mahila Empowerment Party

Iran
Women's Party

Israel
Women's International Zionist Organization (no longer electoral)
Women's Party (historical)
Yitzug Shaveh
U'Bizchutan
Pashut Ahava (2019)
Kol Hanashim (2020)

Japan
Japan Women's Party

South Korea
Korean Independence Patriotic Women's Party
Korean Housewife Party
Chosen Women's National Party
Women's Organization Party
Korean Women's National Party
Women's Party

Kyrgyzstan
Democratic Women's Party of Kyrgyzstan

Lithuania
Women's Party

Moldova
Association of Women of Moldova

Namibia
Namibia Women's Action for Equality Party

Netherlands
Practical Politics (historical)
Netherlands Women's Party

Nigeria
Nigerian Women's Party

Norway
Oslo Women's Party (historical)
Bodø Women's Party (historical)
 Feminist Initiative (Norway)

Panama
Feminist National Party

Philippines
Gabriela Women's Party (GABRIELA)

Poland
Women's Party

Russia
All-Russian Union for Women's Equality (historical)
Female Party (Tomsk)
United Women's Party (St. Petersburg)
Women's Progressive Party (historical)
Women of Russia
Russian Women's Party

Serbia
Women's Party (non-electoral, Yugoslavia)
Civic Alliance of Serbia

Solomon Islands
Twelve Pillars to Peace and Prosperity Party

South Africa
Nationalist Women's Party (historical)
Women's Rights Peace Party
South African Women's Party

Spain
Feminist Party
Feminist Initiative (Spain)

Sweden
Feminist Initiative (Sweden)

Republic of China (Taiwan)
Women's Party
People Are The Boss (人民民主陣線) (especially focus on the right of prostitutes)

Turkey
Women's Party

Ukraine
Ukrainian Christian Women's Party
All-Ukrainian Party of Women's Initiative (officially deregistered by the Ukrainian Ministry of Justice in July 2003)
Women's Party of Ukraine
Women for the Future
Women for the Future of Children
Women of Ukraine
Women's People Party United
Solidarity of Women of Ukraine

United Kingdom
Women's Party (historical)
Northern Ireland Women's Coalition (Northern Ireland)
Women's Equality Party

United States
Equal Rights Party
National Woman's Party (historical, did not run its own candidates)
Feminist Party
Women's Party for Survival

Uruguay
Independent Democratic Feminist Party (historical)

Political parties that advocate feminism along with other ideology

Japan
 Social Democratic Party

Norway
 Red Party (Norway)
 Socialist Left Party

Sweden
 Green Party
 Left Party
 Liberals
 Swedish Social Democratic Party

South Korea
 Green Party Korea
 Progressive Party

United States
Freedom Socialist Party
Green Party
Peace and Freedom Party

References

Parties
Lists by country